Johnny Sawyer (7 June 1902, in Milwaukee, Wisconsin – 17 June 1989, in Milwaukee, Wisconsin) was an American racecar driver.

Indy 500 results

References

1902 births
1989 deaths
Indianapolis 500 drivers
Racing drivers from Milwaukee
Racing drivers from Wisconsin
Sportspeople from Milwaukee
AAA Championship Car drivers